Linux Users' Group of Davis (commonly known as LUGOD) is a users' group of students and faculty from the University of California, Davis, Information technology professionals from the Sacramento region, and hobbyists interested in Linux and free and open-source software. It holds regular meetings in Davis, California, and holds installfests on a regular basis. Its members participate with each other online in numerous mailing lists and via Internet Relay Chat.

History 
The group was founded in early 1999 by Peter J. Salzman, Bill Kendrick, and about a dozen others, following a USENET posting in which Peter asked whether such a group existed in the Davis area. (Salzman and Kendrick held posts as president and vice president for most of the first five years of the group's existence.)

Activities 
When possible, LUGOD participates in many activities, including hands-on demos, exhibit booths at events such as LinuxWorld Expo, classes, fundraisers, and organizing the formerly annual Linux picnic in Sunnyvale, California, together with other SVLUG and other groups.

"Reasons to Avoid Microsoft" 
The LUG's website maintains a collection of news articles meant to help convince users to switch from Microsoft products.

Eric S. Raymond linked to this collection in his famous response to Microsoft's eighth Halloween document.

Notable speakers 
Despite its distance from the Silicon Valley, numerous notable speakers have presented at LUGOD, including:

Individuals 
 Jeremy Allison
 David Anderson of the SETI@home project
 Donald Becker of Scyld Computer Corporation, a wholly owned subsidiary of Penguin Computing
 Steve Coast (founder of OpenStreetMap)
 Chris DiBona
 Asa Dotzler of Mozilla Foundation
 Christian Einfeldt (producer of The Digital Tipping Point)
 Jon "maddog" Hall
 Carsten "Rasterman" Haitzler (creator of Enlightenment)
 Leslie Hawthorn (Open Source Project Manager at Google)
 Valerie Henson
 Simon Horman
 Chander Kant of LinuxCertified
 Bill Kendrick (creator of Tux Paint)
 Sam Lantinga (creator of Simple DirectMedia Layer)
 Rasmus Lerdorf
 Don Marti of LinuxJournal
 Norman Matloff
 Patrick McGovern of SourceForge
 Sean Perry of Debian
 Dave Peticolas
 Kyle Rankin
 Hans Reiser
 Greg Roelofs from PNG
 Lawrence Rosen of Open Source Initiative
 Bill Saphir from Lawrence Berkeley Labs
 Richard Wallace of the A.L.I.C.E. Artificial Intelligence Foundation

Organizations and companies 
 Apple Computer
 AMD
 Borland
 Cisco Systems
 CodeWeavers (creators of CrossOver)
 Electronic Frontier Foundation
 Embedded Linux Consortium
 Encore Technologies (creator of the Simputer)
 Google
 gumstix
 Hitachi
 Hewlett-Packard
 IBM
 Ingres
 LynuxWorks
 No Starch Press
 Oracle Corporation
 Silicon Graphics
 Slim Devices
 Sony Computer Entertainment
 Sybase
 SpectSoft
 VA Linux

References

External links 
 Official website
 "Reasons to Avoid Microsoft" news article collection
 OSNews.com interview with Bill Kendrick, co-founder of LUGOD
 "LUG of Davis" article in "The Lugger" column, Linux User and Developer, issue 67, November 2006

Davis
Davis, California